Arthur Langan Haddon (3 October 1895 – 17 December 1961) was a New Zealand Church of Christ minister, theological college principal, writer and ecumenical leader. He was born in Goulburn, New South Wales, Australia on 3 October 1895.

References

1895 births
1961 deaths
New Zealand educators
New Zealand Protestant ministers and clergy
New Zealand members of the Churches of Christ
People from Goulburn
Australian emigrants to New Zealand